This article provides information on candidates who stood for the 1972 Australian federal election. The election was held on 2 December 1972.

Retiring Members

Labor
 Arthur Calwell MP (Melbourne, Vic)
 Allan Fraser MP (Eden-Monaro, NSW)
 Charles Griffiths MP (Shortland, NSW)
 Hector McIvor MP (Gellibrand, Vic)

Liberal
 Tom Hughes MP (Berowra, NSW)
 Sir Alan Hulme MP (Petrie, Qld)
 Sir Reginald Swartz MP (Darling Downs, Qld)

Country
 Sir Charles Adermann MP (Fisher, Qld)
 Charles Barnes MP (McPherson, Qld)
 Sir Winton Turnbull MP (Mallee, Vic)

House of Representatives
Sitting members at the time of the election are shown in bold text. Successful candidates are highlighted in the relevant colour. Where there is possible confusion, an asterisk (*) is also used.

Australian Capital Territory

New South Wales

Northern Territory

Queensland

South Australia

Tasmania

Victoria

Western Australia

Senate
Sitting Senators are shown in bold text. Tickets that elected at least one Senator are highlighted in the relevant colour. Successful candidates are identified by an asterisk (*).

Queensland
A special election was held in Queensland to fill the casual vacancy caused by the resignation of Liberal Senator Dame Annabelle Rankin. Neville Bonner, also of the Liberal Party, had been appointed to the vacancy in the interim period.

Summary by party 

Beside each party is the number of seats contested by that party in the House of Representatives for each state, as well as an indication of whether the party contested the special Queensland Senate election.

See also
 1972 Australian federal election
 Members of the Australian House of Representatives, 1969–1972
 Members of the Australian House of Representatives, 1972–1974
 List of political parties in Australia

References
Adam Carr's Election Archive - House of Representatives 1972
Adam Carr's Election Archive - Senate 1972

1972 in Australia
Candidates for Australian federal elections